In Greek mythology, Elate is a minor figure, the sister of the two Aloadae giants.

Family 
As sister to the Aloadae, Elate was probably the daughter of Iphimedeia by either Aloeus or Poseidon, the god of the sea.

Mythology 
Elate was big in size, as big as her enormous brothers. When they died after trying to wage war against the heavens, she mourned them so much she was changed into a fir tree. She kept however her great size in her new life, hence the ancient Greek expression "a silver-fir tree big as heaven." Her sister, Platanus, had a similar fate.

See also 

 Heliades
 Pelia
 Niobe

References

Bibliography 
 
 

Women in Greek mythology
Metamorphoses into trees in Greek mythology
Greek giants
Thessalian characters in Greek mythology
Greek legendary creatures
Family of Canace